Chad Austin Gallagher (born May 30, 1969) is a retired American professional basketball player who played in the National Basketball Association (NBA) and other leagues. A 6'10" center played collegiately at Creighton University from 1987 to 1991, and was selected with the fifth pick in the 2nd round of the 1991 NBA draft by the Phoenix Suns.

Gallagher's NBA career consisted of 2 games for the Utah Jazz in February, 1994, playing 3 total minutes and scoring 6 points on 3-of-3 field goals.

In October 1995 he was signed by the Miami Heat but was waived prior to the start of the 1995–96 NBA season.

While playing at Creighton, he was the 1991 Missouri Valley Conference Player of the Year.

References

External links
NBA stats @ basketballreference.com

1969 births
Living people
American expatriate basketball people in Argentina
American expatriate basketball people in France
American expatriate basketball people in Spain
American men's basketball players
Baloncesto Málaga players
Basketball players from Illinois
Centers (basketball)
Creighton Bluejays men's basketball players
Florida Beachdogs players
Libertad de Sunchales basketball players
Liga ACB players
Olimpia de Venado Tuerto basketball players
Omaha Racers players
Paris Racing Basket players
Phoenix Suns draft picks
Rockford Lightning players
Sioux Falls Skyforce (CBA) players
Sportspeople from Rockford, Illinois
Utah Jazz players